Knight Rider: The Game is a video game developed by Davilex Games based on the original television series of the same name.

The game was released in Europe on PlayStation 2 and PC on November 22, 2002 and in North America on the PC on February 12, 2003. The game allows the player to take control of KITT – the Knight Industries Two Thousand, in a range of missions including, racing, exploring, chasing and others. The player will also meet famous villains from the original series, including KARR and Garthe Knight.

Sequel 
A sequel was also produced, named Knight Rider: The Game 2, which was again developed by Davilex Games and was published by Koch Media for PC and PlayStation 2 on 5 November 2004.

See also 

Knight Rider franchise

References

External links
 

Racing video games
Action video games
Windows games
PlayStation 2 games
2002 video games
Video games developed in the Netherlands
Knight Rider video games

Single-player video games
Video games using Havok
Tri Synergy games